Legend (formerly Horror Channel, and Zone Horror) is a British free-to-air television channel specialising in sci-fi, fantasy, thriller, action and cult series. It is broadcast in the UK and Ireland. The channel is known for its horror movies during the evenings and early hours with its schedule featuring in the Films section of the Radio Times rather than with the General Entertainment channels.

History
Horror Channel was available as a free-to-air service on Astra 2F and, since Friday the 13th of March 2015, on Freeview channel 70.  The launch on the Freeview platform increased its viewership by some 300%.

Horror Channel
The Horror Channel was created by Tony Hazell, who had worked for the God Channel. The Horror Channel went into administration on 21 September 2004. The original management team formed a second company (Amore TV Ltd.) and purchased the channel on 22 September 2004, writing off the £200,000 investment made in the channel by venture capital firm, Northern Enterprise.

Zone Vision Networks Ltd. agreed to acquire the Horror Channel for an undisclosed sum on 17 June 2005. In June 2006, the Horror Channel was renamed "Zone Horror" after Zone Vision Networks was renamed AMC Networks International UK. It became a part of the AMC Networks International UK content division of Liberty Global in 2005.

Zone Horror +1 was launched on Sky on 1 July 2008, replacing Zone Reality Extra.

On 30 October 2006, Zonemedia launched Zone Horror in the Netherlands. On 1 July 2009, the channel was dropped from cable in the Netherlands.

On 14 September 2009, it was revealed that the international arm of CBS, CBS Studios International, struck a joint venture deal with Chellomedia to launch six CBS-branded channels in the UK during 2009. The new channels would replace Zone Romantica, Zone Thriller, Zone Horror and CBS Reality, and timeshift services Zone Horror +1 and Zone Reality +1.

On 5 April 2010, Zone Horror was renamed "Horror Channel", following the renaming of the portfolio's other three channels in November 2009. On-air the channel name appears as Horror. The rebrand was produced by Chello Zone's in-house creative services team.

As of May 2014 the channel's pre-show idents incorporated a prominent CBS eye even though CBS does not appear in the channel's name.

Zone Fantasy got rebranded as Horror Channel in Italy on 6 September 2011. Horror Channel closed in Italy on 1 July 2015.

On 21 August 2012, a pre-watershed simulcast of Horror Channel began broadcasting in Sky's Entertainment genre on channel 198, followed by three hours of Psychic Today after 9.00 pm. This version of the channel was replaced by Reality TV, a simulcast of CBS Reality with a Psychic Today block, on 20 May 2013.

On 9 March 2015, Horror Channel appeared on Freeview channel 70 as a placeholder channel, and on 13 March 2015 Horror Channel started broadcasting fully and is the third of the CBS family to move to Freeview in under a year. On 25 May 2022, Horror moved to a higher position on the Freeview guide, by way of switching positions with sibling CBS Justice.

On 30 June 2022 the Horror Channel revised, with the core of the schedule, including series, running on the new channel Legend, which replaced CBS Justice as an entertainment channel. Horror's feature film content was transmitted on a part-time channel, Horror Xtra, broadcasting from 5pm nightly, and set to take Horror's current slot in the Film section of the Sky guide. The change forms part of a larger reshuffle of AMCNI's UK channels taking place on that day.

Horror Channel Films

Horror Channel airs a wide range of films; aside from horror, films of mixed genres with horror themes including sci-fi, thriller, comedy, action and exploitation often screen on the channel. Originally, as The Horror Channel, it premiered a number of classic films including Carnival of Souls, Night of the Living Dead,  The City of the Dead, Vampyr,  The Ghoul, The Killer Shrews, and Lady of Burlesque, while it became known for its showing of B movie classics such as Bloody Birthday, Troll 2, Brain Damage, Elvira, Mistress of the Dark, Frogs, and Slugs. European cinema became notable during the early years of the channel with films including The Devil's Nightmare, Nude for Satan, Black Magic Rites, The Sinful Nuns of Saint Valentine and several films from French director Jean Rollin like The Rape of the Vampire, The Nude Vampire,  Requiem for a Vampire, The Iron Rose, The Demoniacs, The Grapes of Death, Fascination and The Living Dead Girl which were initially shown as part of "The Jean Rollin Season", while two more of his films, Killing Car and The Two Orphan Vampires, screened at a later time. Additional early films consisted of the Troma films Mother's Day and The Toxic Avenger film series, with others such as the Sleepaway Camp trilogy, the Hellraiser trilogy, Pumpkinhead, Flowers in the Attic, Turkey Shoot and Demon Wind.

When the channel was renamed in 2006 as Zone Horror, most of the older films eventually became phased out and were replaced with more recent low-budget and independent films which are less known, such as, Drive-Thru, Choker, Berserker: Hell's Warrior and Blood Ranch, while classic films were shown only on a sporadic basis.

Rebranded as simply Horror Channel in 2010, a number of classic horror films began to premiere on the channel, some of which included The Evil Dead, The Texas Chain Saw Massacre, Happy Birthday to Me and The Incredible Melting Man. Many films were screened as part of horror seasons, with 2011's highlights including "Horror Horreur" for September, "Hammer Horror" for October and "Season of the Banned" for November.  Notable inclusions consisted of the films of European directors Lucio Fulci and Dario Argento, and, screenings of recently released films by home entertainment company Arrow Films, which includes Savage Streets and Street Trash. Following this, Horror Channel has premiered many popular films; Pan's Labyrinth, Halloween II, Halloween III: Season of the Witch, Rabid, Children Shouldn't Play with Dead Things, Peeping Tom, Blue Steel, Wolf Creek and Jeepers Creepers,

Legend
On 30 June 2022, Horror was rebranded as Legend to reflect its schedule of sci-fi, fantasy, thriller, action and cult series. On Freeview, the channel simply rebranded on channel 41, whilst on other platforms it took over the slot vacated by CBS Justice, which AMC/CBS closed.

Horror Channel Programming
The following is a list of television and miniseries which were previously broadcast on Horror.

Note: See List of films broadcast by Horror Channel for all films, including television films.

Former 

 Airwolf
 Andromeda
 Earth: Final Conflict
 Farscape
 Highlander: The Series
 Space: 1999
 Wonder Woman (TV series)
 Sliders
 Star Trek: The Original Series
 Star Trek: Voyager
 Tales from the Darkside
 The Time Tunnel
 UFO
 Under the Dome
 The 4400 (first broadcast 20 February 2011)
 Angel (first broadcast 6 December 2010)
 BeastMaster
 Blood Ties
 Brimstone
 The Chronicle
 The Collector
 Dark Angel
 The Dead Zone
 Doctor Who (1963–1989)
 Firefly
 Freddy's Nightmares
 Friday the 13th: The Series
 Ghost Stories (first broadcast 2004)
 Hammer House of Horror (first broadcast 1 October 2011)
 Haunted 
 The Incredible Hulk (first broadcast 1 September 2014)
 Jericho 
 The Lost World
 Martial Law
 Millennium
 Mortal Kombat: Conquest
 Mutant X
 The New Twilight Zone
 The Ray Bradbury Theatre
 Special Unit 2
 Star Trek: Deep Space Nine  
 Star Trek: The Next Generation
 Tales from the Crypt
 Tales of Mystery and Imagination
 The Invaders
 The New Adventures of Superman (first broadcast 23 October 2015)
 Twin Peaks
 Urban Gothic
 Vampire High (first broadcast 2004)
 The Visitor
 War of the Worlds
 Walker, Texas Ranger (first broadcast 17 October 2022)
 Witchblade
 Xena: Warrior Princess (first broadcast 25 April 2011)

Miniseries 

 The Andromeda Strain
 Creature
 Firestarter: Rekindled
 From the Dead of Night
 Intruders
 Stephen King's Golden Years
 Stephen King's It
 Stephen King's The Langoliers
 Stephen King's Salem's Lot
 Stephen King's The Shining
 Stephen King's The Stand
 Stephen King's The Tommyknockers
 Valemont

Documentaries 

 Grindhouse Trailer Classics: Volume One (2007)
 Grindhouse Trailer Classics: Volume Two (2008)
 Video Nasties: Moral Panic, Censorship & Videotape (2010)

Logos

HorrorXtra
HorrorXtra is a part-time British free-to-air television channel which shows horror films from 5pm in the evening hours. As of 1 July 2022, its available in the Movies section on the Sky EPG, where it can be found on channels 317 and 318 (with the latter being the +1 timeshifted service), on channel 192 on Virgin Media and Freesat 138, however for the time being HorrorXtra is currently not being broadcast on Freeview.

References

External links
 http://www.legend-tv.co.uk
 https://www.horrorxtra.co.uk

AMC Networks International
Paramount International Networks
Horror fiction
English-language television stations in the United Kingdom
Television channels and stations established in 2004
Defunct television channels in the Netherlands
2004 establishments in the United Kingdom